Muddula Menalludu is a 1990 Indian Telugu-language drama film produced by S. Gopal Reddy on Bhargav Art Productions banner and directed by Kodi Ramakrishna. It stars Nandamuri Balakrishna, Vijayashanti  and the music was composed by K. V. Mahadevan. The film was a remake of Tamil film Thangamana Raasa.

Plot
The film begins in an estate where a family rival owing to blood-fled is still pursued by kinsmen Madhava Rao & Raja. The two hold the utmost respect and authority over the region. All the time, a battle erupts between them for petty issues. Rajeswari Devi their paternal aunt always undertakes negotiations to reunite them. She conjugal her elder daughter Parvati with Madhava Rao and her younger daughter Shanti loves Raja. Here, Raja constantly embraces his hands towards Madhava Rao and respects him as his elder which he denies. 

Just after, Rajeswari Devi plans to knit Raja & Shanti which Madhava Rao is averse to and also warns her to desert his wife in case she proceeds further. Then, Raja affirms that he will marry Shanti only with the approval of his brother. However, benevolent Parvati quits the house and performs their wedding. Since Madhava Rao’s outrage peaks Raja seizes his authority. So, he is in cahoots with a heinous Police officer to denounce Raja but he pays him back. In tandem, Sumathi sister of Madhava Rao loves a school teacher Raghu, and Raja words to couple them. Knowing it, Madhava Rao becomes ferocious and subjects them to punishment. 

Besides, Radha a mate of Raja whom he treats as his sister arrives. Unfortunately, knaves attribute illicit relations between them. The next, the Police officer slays her and incriminates Raja. Moreover, he falsifies Shanti as worse when enraged Rajeswari Devi slaughters him and commits suicide to conjoin the families. By the time, Raja absconds when Rajeswari Devi takes a promise to nuptial Sumathi with her love interest. Now by hiding, Raja arranges for their wedding and Madhava Rao intrigues to eliminate them. In the assault, Madhava Rao is severely injured and Raja saves him by giving him his blood when he reforms. Finally, the movie ends on a happy note with the reunion of the family.

Cast

Nandamuri Balakrishna as Raja 
Vijayashanti as Shanti
Nassar as Madhava Rao
Brahmaji as Raja's younger brother
Vasanth as Raghu
Prasanna Kumar as Nagaraju
Balaji as Subbaiyah
Mada as Thief 
KK Sarma as Constable
Babu Mohan as Thief
Telephone Satyanarayana as Jailor
Chidatala Appa Rao as Constable Perumallu   
Dham as Priest
Jayanthi as Rajeswari Devi
Sangeetha as Parvathi
Anitha as Raja's mother
Lathasri as Radha
Sarada Pritha as Sumathi
Kalpana Rai

Soundtrack

Music composed by K. V. Mahadevan. Music released on Lahari Music Company.

References

1990 films
Films directed by Kodi Ramakrishna
Films scored by K. V. Mahadevan
1990s Telugu-language films
Telugu remakes of Tamil films